Ulrike Nasse-Meyfarth (born 4 May 1956) is a German former high jumper. She won the Olympic title twice, in 1972 and 1984. She is the youngest Olympic champion ever in women's high jump, and at the time of her 1984 triumph, she also was the oldest ever.

Biography

The athletic career of Meyfarth took off quickly. In 1971, when she was only fifteen, she already placed second at the West German Championships, and the following year she qualified as the third member of the West German team for the 1972 Summer Olympics that were held in Munich.

Meyfarth was one of the few jumpers who had already adopted the new high jumping style first displayed by Dick Fosbury at the Mexico Olympics four years earlier. Not much was expected from Meyfarth, who had a 1.85-metre personal best. Yet in front of the patriotic home crowd, she rose to the occasion and improved her best by 5 cm to reach 1.90 metres – enough to secure the gold medal. She added another 2 cm to equal the standing world record and became the youngest Olympic champion in athletics in an individual event, at only 16 years old.

Her career stagnated after this surprising victory, and she didn't improve on her 1.92-metre mark until 1978. She did not win any titles in the meantime, placing 7th and 5th at the 1974 and 1978 European Championships, and not reaching the final of the high jump competition at the 1976 Montreal Games. Because of the West German boycott of the 1980 Moscow Olympics, she did not compete there.

1982 was Meyfarth's comeback year. She won the European championships indoor and outdoor, and set a new world record of 2.02 m at the latter occasion. In 1983, she finished second at the first World Championships, after a close fight with Tamara Bykova, whom she had beaten at the European Championships the year before. At a competition in London, both Bykova and Meyfarth cleared 2.03 m, again a new world record. Bykova added another centimetre to this mark just four days later.

The 1984 Summer Olympics event in Los Angeles was Ulrike Meyfarth's last major championship. Several of her toughest competitors, including Bykova, were absent because most of the East Bloc nations boycotted the Olympics. She defeated the reigning Olympic champion – Italy's Sara Simeoni – and cleared 2.02 meters to win her second Olympic title. This time, Meyfarth was the oldest woman to win the Olympic high jump title.

She started her career in the club LG Rhein-Ville, becoming West German national silver medalist in 1971 and bronze medalist in 1972. She then moved to ASV Köln, and became West German champion in 1973, 1975, 1979 and 1980–1983. She also took another bronze in 1976 and silvers in 1978 and 1984.

Personal life
In 1983 she posed naked as model for "The Highjumper", a bronze sculpture by Arno Breker.
In 1987 she married Roland Nasse, a lawyer from Cologne. With him and their two daughters, she lives in Odenthal, a town north of Cologne.
Nasse-Meyfarth studied at the Deutschen Sporthochschule Köln (DSK). She is a diplomated sports teacher and since 1997 a trainer and talent scout at german sports club TSV Bayer 04 Leverkusen (as of 2019).

International competitions

1 Representing Europe

References

External links

Leverkusen who's who
Ulrike Meyfarth official site 

1956 births
Living people
Sportspeople from Frankfurt
People from Rheinisch-Bergischer Kreis
Sportspeople from Cologne (region)
West German female high jumpers
ASV Köln athletes
Olympic athletes of West Germany
Athletes (track and field) at the 1972 Summer Olympics
Athletes (track and field) at the 1976 Summer Olympics
Athletes (track and field) at the 1984 Summer Olympics
Olympic gold medalists for West Germany
World record setters in athletics (track and field)
World Athletics Championships medalists
European Athletics Championships medalists
Medalists at the 1984 Summer Olympics
Medalists at the 1972 Summer Olympics
Olympic gold medalists in athletics (track and field)
Universiade medalists in athletics (track and field)
Universiade silver medalists for West Germany
Medalists at the 1979 Summer Universiade